Mauritius competed in the 2008 Summer Olympics held in Beijing, People's Republic of China from August 8 to August 24, 2008. Bruno Julie won Mauritius's first ever medal (bronze) in boxing.

Medalists

Archery

Mauritius sent archers to the Olympics for the third time, seeking the nation's first Olympic medal in the sport. The country was given one spot in the women's individual competition via Tripartite Commission invitation; Veronique D'Unienville will be Mauritius's representative.

Athletics

Men
Track & road events

Field events

Women
Track & road events

Badminton

Boxing

Mauritius qualified two boxers for the Olympic boxing tournament. Julie and Colin both earned spots at the second African qualifying tournament. Bruno Julie is the first Olympic medalist for Mauritius since the nation began competing at the 1984 Summer Olympics. Julie secured a bronze medal with the quarterfinal victory over Venezuela's Héctor Manzanilla on August 18, 2008.

Cycling

Road

Swimming

Men

Women

Weightlifting

References

External links

Nations at the 2008 Summer Olympics
2008
Olympics